Go Go Golf, known in Japan as , is a golf-simulation video game originally released in 2000 for the PlayStation 2. It was developed by Mahou and published by Midas Interactive Entertainment in Europe in 2002.

Gameplay
Go Go Golf offers three 18 hole courses across various landscapes - the desert, mountains and woods.

References

External links
Go Go Golf at IGN

2000 video games
Golf video games
Magical Company games
PlayStation 2 games
PlayStation 2-only games
Video games developed in Japan